Diego Soria y Lerma Polanco, O.P. (died 1613) was a Roman Catholic prelate who served as the second Bishop of Nueva Segovia (1602–1613).

Biography
Diego Soria was born in Yébenes, Spain and ordained a priest in the Order of Preachers.
On 15 November 1602, he was appointed during the papacy of Pope Clement VIII as Bishop of Nueva Segovia.
In 1603, he was consecrated bishop. 
He served as Bishop of Nueva Segovia until his death in 1613.

References 

17th-century Roman Catholic bishops in the Philippines
Bishops appointed by Pope Clement VIII
1613 deaths
Dominican bishops
People from Vigan